The Dutch Eerste Divisie in the 1979–80 season was contested by 19 teams. FC Groningen won the championship.

New entrants
Relegated from the 1978–79 Eredivisie
 FC Volendam
 VVV-Venlo
Dordrecht changed their name to DS '79 this season
Fortuna SC changed their name to Fortuna Sittard this season

League standings

Promotion competition
In the promotion competition, four period winners (the best teams during each of the four quarters of the regular competition) played for promotion to the Eredivisie.

See also
 1979–80 Eredivisie
 1979–80 KNVB Cup

References
Netherlands - List of final tables (RSSSF)

Eerste Divisie seasons
2
Neth